Events in the year 2006 in the Republic of India.

Incumbents
 President of India: A.P.J. Abdul Kalam
 Prime Minister of India: Manmohan Singh
 Vice President of India – Bhairon Singh Shekhawat
 Chief Justice of India – Yogesh Kumar Sabharwal

Governors
 Andhra Pradesh – Sushilkumar Shinde (until 29 January), Rameshwar Thakur (starting 29 January)
 Arunachal Pradesh – Shilendra Kumar Singh
 Assam – Ajai Singh
 Bihar – Buta Singh
 Chhattisgarh – Krishna Mohan Seth 
 Goa – S. C. Jamir
 Gujarat – Nawal Kishore Sharma
 Haryana – Akhlaqur Rahman Kidwai
 Himachal Pradesh – Vishnu Sadashiv Kokje 
 Jammu and Kashmir – Syed Sibtey Razi
 Jharkhand – S. K. Sinha 
 Karnataka – T. N. Chaturvedi
 Kerala – R. L. Bhatia
 Madhya Pradesh – Balram Jakhar
 Maharashtra – S.M. Krishna
 Manipur – Shivinder Singh Sidhu
 Meghalaya – M.M. Jacob
 Mizoram – Amolak Rattan Kohli (until 24 July), M. M. Lakhera (starting 24 July)
 Nagaland – Shyamal Datta
 Odisha – Rameshwar Thakur
 Punjab – Sunith Francis Rodrigues
 Rajasthan – Pratibha Patil
 Sikkim – 
 until 12 July: V. Rama Rao
 13 July-12 August: R.S. Gavai
 starting 12 August: V. Rama Rao
 Tamil Nadu – Surjit Singh Barnala
 Tripura – Dinesh Nandan Sahay
 Uttar Pradesh – T. V. Rajeswar
 Uttarakhand – Sudarshan Agarwal
 West Bengal – Gopalkrishna Gandhi

Events

 National income - 42,546,290 million
 2 January – Rajnath Singh assumed office as Bharatiya Janata Party (BJP) chief.
 7–9 January  – Pravasi Bharatiya Divas was organized in Hyderabad.
 26 January – Saudi monarch King Abdullah was chief guest at Republic Day parade in New Delhi.
 2–5 March – President of the United States, George W. Bush visited India. The United States signed a landmark nuclear deal with India pending approval from the US Congress and Indian Parliament.
 7 March – 2006 Varanasi bombings: A terrorist attack in Varanasi killed at least 15 people and left more than 50 injured.
 4 April - Two Vishva Hindu Parishad workers named Naresh and Himanshu Panse killed in blasts while they were assembling a bomb at a house in Nanded.
 10 April – Fire at Brand India Fair at Meerut Victoria Park in Meerut, Uttar Pradesh, killed 100.
 6 July – The Nathula Pass between India and China, sealed during the Sino-Indian War, re-opened for trade after 44 years.
 11 July – 11 July 2006 Mumbai train bombings: A series of coordinated bomb attacks struck several commuter trains in Mumbai, India during the evening rush hour.
 29 August – A 90% iron meteorite weighing 6.8 kilograms fell in Kanvarpura village in Rajasthan, near Rawatbhata, where the Rajasthan Atomic Power Station is located. It came to earth in the middle of the day and was found by two shepherds. Scientists from the Geological Survey of India rushed to the village to recover the object. The Deputy Director-General (western region) of the Geological Survey, R.S. Goyal, said that devastation on an "unimaginable scale" would have ensued had the meteorite struck the power station.
 20 November – 2006 West Bengal train disaster: A suspected terrorist attack killed five people on a train in a remote area of West Bengal.

Births
29 May –  Gukesh Dommaraju,  Grandmaster

Deaths

3 January – Vijay Raghunath Pandharipande, physicist (born 1940).
3 February – Nadira, actress (born 1932).
8 February – Kuljeet Randhawa, Indian actress and former model (born 1976)
25 March – Chandrakant Bakshi, author (born 1932).
28 March – Bansi Lal, Haryana's four time chief minister, and defence minister of India during Indian Emergency (1975 – 77) (born 1927)
12 April – Rajkumar, actor and singer (born 1929).
3 May – Pramod Mahajan, politician (born 1949).
5 May – Naushad Ali, musician and composer (born 1919).
8 July – Raja Rao, novelist and short story writer (born 1908).
21 August – Bismillah Khan, shehnai musician and Bharat Ratna winner (born 1916).
27 August – Hrishikesh Mukherjee, film director (born 1922).
24 September – Padmini, actress and dancer (born 1932).
9 October – Kanshi Ram, politician and founder of Bahujan Samaj Party (born 1934).
19 October- Srividya, South Indian actress (born 1953).

Observance
Following days of religious or cultural significance were observed in 2006.

13 January – Lohri, Punjab
13 January – Arudra Darisanam, Tamil Nadu
13–14 January – Bikaner Camel Festival
14 January – International Kite Festival, Ahmedabad and Jaipur
14 January – Uttarayan Kite Festival, Gujarat
16 January – Jallikattu festival, Alanganallur
16 January – Modhera Dance Festival, Modhera
31 January – Muharram
2 February – Basant Panchami
26 February – Maha Shiv Ratri
15 March – Holi

See also 

 Bollywood films of 2006

References

 
Years of the 21st century in India